Yale School of Nursing (YSN) is the nursing school of Yale University, located in West Haven, Connecticut. It is among the top 20 graduate schools in the country, according to the latest rankings by U.S. News & World Report (2017). In addition to the top 20 tier overall ranking, the school’s midwifery specialty had the second-highest score nationally as ranked by peer institutions. Yale School of Nursing’s psychiatric-mental health specialty ranked sixth, and its pediatric nurse practitioner specialty came in at fifth in a three-way tie. Yale’s School of Nursing remains among the most selective in the nation, with only 29% of applicants accepted.

Established in 1923 in New Haven, Connecticut, YSN moved in 2013 to Yale University's West Campus, located in West Haven and Orange, CT.

Academics
Degrees offered include Doctor of Nursing Practice, a Doctor of Philosophy and Master of Science in Nursing degree with nurse practitioner, nursing management, policy and leadership, and nurse-midwifery specialties. The school also has the Graduate Entry Prespecialty in Nursing (GEPN) program, which is intended for students with a bachelor's degree but no background in nursing. Joint degree programs are available with Yale School of Public Health and Yale Divinity School.

In addition to degree programs, YSN offers pre and post doctoral research training and post-master's certificates in various nurse practitioner specialities.

History

The Yale School of Nursing was founded in 1923 with funding from the Rockefeller Foundation. It celebrated its 90th anniversary in 2013.

The Yale School of Nursing was the first School of Nursing to adopt the strong professional standards from the Goldmark Report of 1923 which it had sponsored with the Rockefeller Foundation to determine the best form of nurse training in 1918. It had its own Dean, faculty, budget and required a standardized degree. Annie Warburton Goodrich was appointed the first Dean of YSN and was the first woman Dean at Yale University.

In 1934, bachelor's degrees were required for admission and Yale Corporation authorized the Master of Nursing degree. This program, allowing students with no prior background in nursing graduate entry, would continue until 1956 when the Master of Science in Nursing (MSN) program began. The MSN required students to have a prior background in nursing in order to gain entry into the program. The Nurse Practitioner track within the MSN degree was established in 1971 with the offering of the Pediatric Nurse Practitioner specialty. This was expanded in 1972, when the Family Nurse Practitioner specialty began. By 1975 YSN offered 10 specialty programs and tracks, and was at the vanguard of the education of nurse practitioners at the graduate level along with clinical nurse specialists and nurse-midwives. In 1974, YSN reopened admission for students with no prior background in nursing through its Three-Year Program for Non-Nurse College Graduates (later called the GEPN program).

Deans

 Annie W. Goodrich (1923–1934)
 Effie Jane Taylor (1934–1944)
 Elizabeth Seelye Bixler Torrey (1944–1959)
 Florence Schorske Wald (1959–1966)
 Margaret Gene Arnstein (1967–1972)
 Donna Kaye Diers (1972–1984)
 Judith Belliveau Krauss (1985–1998)
 Catherine L. Gilliss (1998–2004)
 Margaret Grey (2005–2015)
 Ann Kurth (2016–present)

Notable faculty
Lucy Conant
Donna Diers
James Dickoff
Rhetaugh Graves Dumas
Elizabeth Gordon Fox
Annie W. Goodrich
Virginia Avenel Henderson 
Patricia James
Tish Knobf
Mark Lazenby
Ruth McCorkle
Douglas Olsen
Ida Jean Orlando 
Rachel Robinson
Florence Schorske Wald
Ernestine Wiedenbach
Helen Varney Burst
Linda Honan
Loren Fields

References

External links

http://premium.usnews.com/best-graduate-schools/top-nursing-schools/yale-university-33045

Nursing
Nursing schools in Connecticut
Educational institutions established in 1923
1923 establishments in Connecticut